30th Central Scientific Research Institute, Ministry of Defence was a scientific research organization operated by the Ministry of Defence of Russia which was dedicated to leading a wide range of studies in support of enhancing the Russian Air Force's capabilities and development of the aerospace warfighting methods, technologies and complexes.

In the English-language sources, the institute is often mentioned by the transliteration of its Russian abbreviation – TsNII-30.   
The institute was located in Shchyolkovo, Moscow Oblast at the Chkalovsky Airport.

TsNII-30 has operated for exactly 50 years.

History 
TsNII-30 was established on January 16, 1961.

Its original name was the Central Scientific Research Institute, Russian Air Force. It was based on the Ministry of Defence Computer Center No. 3 in Noginsk, Moscow Oblast. The center got the status of one of the TsNII-30 organizational units - Air Force Control Systems Research Center — .
Later, TsNII-15, Russian Navy research institute, located in Leningrad was amalgamated with the TsNII-30 and became its subsidiary focused on the Navy aviation.

As of 2006, the institute's workforce had 16 Doctors of Science and 215 Ph.Ds (Candidates of Science).

Scope of activities and projects 
The fields of the TsNII-30 research included strategic, tactical, technical, economical studies.
Some of areas of the activities were:

Threat assessment and forecasting.
Defining operational and technical requirements.
Monitoring defence industry progress on the Russian Air Force acquisitions.
Performance evaluations of the newly developed aerospace technologies and complexes.

Systems approach to the development and procurement of the aerospace warfighting means and simulation modeling were the corner stones of the TsNII-30 research methodology.

TsNII-30 was part of a broad Russian aerospace industry cooperation to build:
Spiral spaceplane
Buran (spacecraft)

Commanders 
  (1961—1969)
 Anatoly Molotkov (1969—1988)
 Georgy Shonin (1988—1990)
 Vladimir Kovalyonok (1990—1992)
 Vasily Aleksandrov (1992—1998)
 Sergei Shalaev (1998—1999)
 Alexander Gerasimov (2000—2007)
 Yuri Balyko (2007—2011)

Notable personnel 
,
Vycheslav Baklitskii
Anatoly Glazkov
Gennady Gorchitsa

Aleksei Gubarev
Vasily Minakov
Vladimir Tupikov
Yevgeny Khrunov
Arthur Yuryev

Sample books published 

 
 Panov, V.V., Gorchitsa, G.I., Balyko, Y.P., et el "Forming a concept of the future aviation complexes" 2010, 608p. .
 Platunov, V.S. "Methodology of the defence scientific research in aviation complexes: 30 TsNII. 2005. 343p.  .

International activities 
In the early 1990s, TsNII-30 staff participated in the preparation of the Russian Air Force exhibitions and represented Russia at the international air shows.
 ILA Berlin Air Show, 1991.
 Russian-American seminar on the US Air Force combat in Operation Desert Storm. Moscow. October 12, 1992. American side was represented by the RAND corporation analysts. The delegation was headed by Ambassador Robert Blackwill Russian delegation included researchers from TsNII-30 and Air Force Engineering Academy. The keynote report was made by Benjamin S. Lambeth from RAND.
 Australian International Airshow. October 1992. Avalon, Victoria, Australia. Russian delegation presented supercargo Antonov AN-124 and helicopters Mil Mi-17 and Kamov Ka-32.
 International Conference Air Power. February 11–12, 1993. London, Great Britain. The Head of the TsNII-30 Vassily E. Aleksandrov presented a paper on "Prospects for Air Superiority Fighter Development"
 Abbotsford International Airshow, August 1993. Russia was represented by the "Russian Knights" aerobatic group flying  Sukhoi Su-27, and Ilyushin Il-76 cargo.

References

Russian military aviation
Russian Air Force
Soviet Air Force
Military units and formations of the Soviet Union
Research institutes in the Soviet Union
Institutes of Russian Ministry of Defense
Aerospace research institutes
1961 establishments in the Soviet Union
2011 disestablishments in Russia
Military installations of Russia